Orson Spencer Clawson (1852–1916) generally known simply as Spencer Clawson, was a politician, businessman and inventor in Salt Lake City in the general time frame of 1900.

Clawson was the son of Hiram B. Clawson and his wife Ellen Spencer Clawson.  Ellen was the daughter of Orson Spencer for whom Spencer Clawson was named.  Spencer Clawson was baptized a Latter-day Saint in 1860 at the age of eight.

Clawson was a half-brother of Rudger Clawson who worked for a time under Clawson in the dry goods trade.

In 1900 Clawson received a patent for a method of typing both a letter's address and the letter itself on the same sheet of paper.  In 1890 Clawson was the candidate of the People's Party for mayor of Salt Lake City but he lost to George M. Scott the candidate of the Liberal Party.

Clawson married Nabbie Howe Young a daughter of Brigham Young and Clarissa Clara Decker.  Spencer and Nabbie had six children.

Clawson was involved in the dry goods trade in Salt Lake City, buying most of his products from New York City where he was well known among wholesalers.

Spencer Clawson was also on the original committee that worked to form Latter-day Saint College in 1886.  This institution has gone through many changes in name and function but is the ancestor of the current LDS Business College.

Clawson was also the president of the Pioneer Jubilee celebration in 1897.

Clawson's son Orson Spencer Clawson Jr. was a great musician and pianist.  Another son, Curtis Young Clawson, was a major in the United States Army artillery in World War I.

Sources 
 Deseret News, Sep. 29, 1900.
 Andrew Jenson.  LDS Biographical Encyclopedia, Vol. 4, p. 289; Vol. 2, p. 615.
 B. H. Roberts, Comprehensive History of the Church, Vol. 6, p. 206
 Utah Genealogical Magazine article on Brigham Young's descendants

1852 births
1916 deaths
Latter Day Saints from Utah
Politicians from Salt Lake City
People's Party (Utah) politicians
Businesspeople from Salt Lake City
19th-century American businesspeople